Robin Thede is an American comedian, actress and writer. Raised in Iowa, she has also worked as an entertainment correspondent, host, and radio personality.  In 2015, she became the first African-American woman to be head writer for a late-night talk show (The Nightly Show with Larry Wilmore).  From 2017 to 2018, Thede hosted The Rundown with Robin Thede on BET. She created and co-stars in the Emmy-nominated HBO series A Black Lady Sketch Show.

Early life and education 
Robin Thede was born in Spencer, Iowa. Her parents are Phyllis Thede, who is African American, and Dave Thede, who is German American. Robin Thede was named after stand-up comedian and actor Robin Williams. She stated  on Late Night with Seth Meyers this was most likely due to her father's love of Williams' work. She grew up in Davenport, Iowa, where her father was an educator and her mother also worked in community schools and served with the union for school staff. Thede's two sisters were born there. Thede and her sisters attended local schools in Davenport. Later her parents moved to Bettendorf, Iowa.

Her mother was elected in 2009 as Iowa State Representative for House District 93 and has been repeatedly re-elected. She continues to serve in the legislature.

Thede graduated from Northwestern University in Evanston, Illinois, earning a degree in Broadcast Journalism and African-American Studies. After college, Thede studied at The Second City theatre group in Chicago.

Career 
Robin first started with a sketch comedy group called Cleos Apartment with writers Diallo Riddle and Bashir Salahuddin. Members included Thomas Fraser, Wyatt Cenac, Nika Williams and Nefetari Spencer. That stage show was picked up online by AOL and HBO for a new show called The Message which ran for a full year, 2007.

Thede was also head writer and a performer on The Nightly Show with Larry Wilmore. From 2015–16, she was the head writer for the first season and a half of The Nightly Show, the first African-American woman to hold that position on any late-night talk show.  Thede is also the second African-American woman to write for a late-night talk show, as Amber Ruffin was first to join the writing staff for Late Night with Seth Meyers.

Prior to that, she was head writer on The Queen Latifah Show and staff writer on the first two seasons of Real Husbands of Hollywood on BET. In January 2013, she appeared in the Marlon Wayans' comedy A Haunted House opposite comedian JB Smoove. She also had recurring appearances as "Gail" on Second Generation Wayans on BET in March 2013.

Thede has often worked on TV shows as both a writer and actress, including on the short-lived Fox series In the Flow with Affion Crockett, the Mike Epps sketch comedy series Funny Bidness, and on the comedy series Clunkers (starring Carl Payne, David Faustino and Sherman Hemsley).

Thede's recent television appearances include roles on Key & Peele (Comedy Central), Hot In Cleveland (TV Land), Chocolate News (Comedy Central),  Kath & Kim (NBC), Worst Week (CBS) and All of Us (UPN). She was a series regular on the BET original web series Buppies with Tatyana Ali.

Thede's other writing credits include BET Awards (2014), BET Honors (2013), UNCF: An Evening of Stars (2013), BET Awards (2007, 2008, 2009, 2010, 2011, 2012), NAACP Image Awards (2011), the BET Hip Hop Awards (2010, 2011, 2012) and more.

Additionally, Thede has created several successful videos, including "Shit Black Guys Say" (which went viral with 2.5 million views on YouTube), "Every Little Step" with Wayne Brady, Bobby Brown and Mike Tyson (Funny or Die.com), and "For Stuffed Colored Girls" (Funny or Die.com). She can also be seen with Elite Delta Force 3 in "The Real Housewives of Civil Rights" (Funny or Die.com/EDF3 YouTube Channel).

Thede's comedy work extends from years of professional live sketch comedy (Second City Chicago and LA, Improv Olympic, Acme) to comedic commentary on shows such as 10 Things I Hate About Me for the Style Network. She is also a performer and writer for the all-female sketch group "Elite Delta Force 3", which won the 2009 Audience Award Winner of the Los Angeles Comedy Improv Festival.

Other notable work includes co-hosting on The Voice of Reason on Jamie Foxx's Foxxhole Sirius/XM radio channel. She worked as a regular entertainment correspondent for E! News with Ryan Seacrest and Giuliana Rancic.

In October 2017, Thede began hosting her own late-night TV talk show, The Rundown with Robin Thede on BET. She is one of a few African-American women to host their own late-night show.

In June 2019, Thede was named one of Variety's 10 Comics to Watch for 2019. Most recently Thede created, writes, and performs in A Black Lady Sketch Show, which premiered on HBO on August 2, 2019. In April 2021, the second season of A Black Lady Sketch Show premiered.

In 2020, she signed a development deal with Warner Bros. Television.

Filmography

As writer

As actress

Other appearances

Awards and nominations

Emmy Awards 
The Emmy Awards are presented by the Academy of Television Arts & Sciences.

Mipcom Awards 
Mipcom's Diversify TV Excellence Awards are presented annually in order to recognize, champion and celebrate diversity, equality and inclusion in television programming across the international television industry. Thede has been honored with 1 award.

TCA Awards 
The TCA Awards are awards presented by the Television Critics Association in recognition of excellence in television. Thede has won 1 award.

References

External links 

A Black Lady Sketch Show on HBO

Living people
African-American actresses
American women comedians
American radio personalities
People from Spencer, Iowa
Actors from Davenport, Iowa
Northwestern University alumni
Writers from Davenport, Iowa
1979 births
American people of German descent
Comedians from Iowa
Actresses from Iowa
21st-century American actresses
American television writers
American women television writers
American women screenwriters
21st-century American women writers
Screenwriters from Iowa
21st-century American comedians
21st-century American screenwriters
African-American female comedians
21st-century African-American women writers
21st-century African-American writers
20th-century African-American people
20th-century African-American women